This is a list of fellows of the Royal Society elected in 1725.

Fellows
 Silvanus Bevan (1691–1765), apothecary and physician
 Maurice Antonio de Capeller (1685–1769), Swiss physician and mathematician 
 Andreas Henry de Cronhelm (fl 1725–1753), German
 Charles de la Faye (1677–1762), Clerk of the Signet
 Antonio Galvao (fl 1725-1730), Portuguese ambassador to London
 Nathan Hickman (c.1695–1746) 
 Thomas Hill (c.1683–1758), poet
 Robert Houston (c.1678–1734), physician 
 Thomas Hunt (died 1731?), Captain, 1st Dragoon Guards
 Robert Nesbitt (c.1697–1761), physician 
 Casper Neumann (1683–1737), German chemist
 Richard Poley (died 1770), Secretary to the British Envoy in Sweden
 Thomas Roby (1689–1729)
 Edmund Stone (1700–1768), mathematician
 George Lewis Teissier (died 1742), German physician 
 James Theobald (died 1759), merchant 
 Taylor White (1701-1772), barrister and collector

References

1725
1725 in science
1725 in England